The  was a limited express train service in Japan operated by Japanese National Railways (JNR) between  and  in Hokkaido, Japan, from 1975 to 1980.

Rolling stock
Services comprised 485-1500 series EMUs, and were the first limited express trains comprising electric multiple units to operate in Hokkaido. The 485 series EMUs proved to be unsuited to the harsh weather conditions of Hokkaido, with frequent cancellations, and were later replaced by new 781 series 6-car EMUs.

Formation
The typical 6-car formation (in 1980) was as shown below with car 1 at the Sapporo end.

History
Ishikari services were introduced on 18 July 1975, and continued until the start of the 1 October 1980 timetable revision, when the services were replaced by new Lilac services.

References

Named passenger trains of Japan
Japanese National Railways
Railway services introduced in 1975
Railway services discontinued in 1980
1975 establishments in Japan
1980 disestablishments in Japan

ja:いしかり (列車)